Fruitvale is an unincorporated community in Yakima County, Washington, United States, located within the north city limits of Yakima.

The community was established around 1906 around a train station of the North Yakima and Valley Railway Company. The name was chosen because of the importance of fruit production to Yakima Valley's economy and the word 'vale' meaning valley.

References

Northern Pacific Railway
Unincorporated communities in Yakima County, Washington
Unincorporated communities in Washington (state)